For the Italian football club Inter Milan (Football Club Internazionale Milano), the 2002–03 season marked its 94th in existence and its 87th consecutive season in the top flight of Italian football. The team finished second in Serie A and reached the semifinals of the UEFA Champions League. Christian Vieri was the top goalscorer.

Season summary
The start of the season was marked by the departure of Ronaldo and the arrival of Hernán Crespo after club had already acquired Fabio Cannavaro, Matías Almeyda and Domenico Morfeo. Crespo, along with Christian Vieri, built an attacking duo. Crespo was essential in the 2002–03 UEFA Champions League  while Vieri usually scored in the domestic matches. Their partnership worked until Crespo sustained an injury, which sidelined him for several weeks. Without him, despite replacing Crespo with Gabriel Batistuta, Inter lost some key matches. One of these was against Juventus who, could finally aim for the title. 

Inter managed to reach the Champions League quarter-finals after passing in second in the group phase. Inter's opponent was Valencia, winning 1–0 at home. A 2–1 defeat in Spain had no effect on qualification, due to the away goals rule. As Crespo came back from injury, Vieri got injured, but he managed to retain the title of the league's top scorer, with 24 goals. In the semi-finals, Inter lost to Milan due to Andriy Shevchenko's away goal in the second leg, equalized by Obafemi Martins, for a 1–1 aggregate that sent Milan to the final on away goals. Focused on the European competition, Inter collected two draws in the league that stuck them behind Juventus, who won their second-straight title.

Squad
Squad at end of season

Left club during season

Transfers

Winter

Loan out
  Salvatore Ferraro –  Prato, loan
  Alex Cordaz –  Spezia, loan
  Goran Pandev –  Spezia, loan

Competitions

Overview

Serie A

League table

Results summary

Results by round

Matches

Coppa Italia

Round of 16

UEFA Champions League

Qualifying phase

Third qualifying round

First group stage

Second group stage

Knockout phase

Quarter-finals

Semi-finals

Statistics

Appearances and goals
As of 31 June 2003

Goalscorers
{| class="wikitable sortable" style="font-size: 95%; text-align: center;"
|-
!width="7%"|No.
!width="7%"|Pos.
!width="7%"|Nation
!width="20%"|Name
!Serie A
!Coppa Italia
!Champions League
!Total
|-
| 32
| FW
| 
| Christian Vieri
| 24 
| 0 
| 3 
|27 
|-
| 9
| FW
| 
| Hernán Crespo
| 7 
| 0 
| 9 
|16 
|-
| 20
| FW
| 
| Álvaro Recoba
| 9 
| 0 
| 3 
|12 
|-
| 14
| MF
| 
| Luigi Di Biagio
| 4 
| 0 
| 3 
|7 
|-
| 5
| MF
| 
| Emre Belözoğlu
| 4 
| 0 
| 1 
|5 
|-
| 3
| FW
| 
| Mohamed Kallon
| 4 
| 0 
| 0 
|4 
|-
| 30
| FW
| 
| Obafemi Martins
| 1 
| 0 
| 2 
|3 
|-
| 2
| DF
| 
| Iván Córdoba
| 1 
| 0 
| 1 
|2 
|-
| 10
| MF
| 
| Domenico Morfeo
| 1 
| 0 
| 1 
|2 
|-
| 19
| FW
| 
| Gabriel Batistuta
| 2 
| 0 
| 0 
|2 
|-
| 22
| MF
| 
| Okan Buruk
| 2 
| 0 
| 0 
|2 
|-
| 4
| DF
| 
| Javier Zanetti
| 1 
| 0 
| 0 
|1 
|-
| 7
| MF
| 
| Sérgio Conçeicão
| 0 
| 1 
| 0 
|1 
|-
| 15
| DF
| 
| Daniele Adani
| 1 
| 0 
| 0 
|1 
|-
| 23
| DF
| 
| Marco Materazzi
| 1 
| 0 
| 0 
|1 
|-
| 25
| MF
| 
| Matias Almeyda
| 0 
| 0 
| 1 
|1 
|-
| #
| colspan=3 | Own goals
| 1 
| 0 
| 4 
|5 
|-
|-
|- bgcolor="F1F1F1" 
| colspan=4 | TOTAL
| 64 
| 1  
| 28 
| 93

References

External links
Official website

Inter Milan seasons
Internazionale